Fulcrum is a drumming term. Traditionally, the fulcrum is said to denote the part of a percussionist's grip that is the main lever for the drumstick/mallet to rotate. This is  usually created by the thumb + index finger, the thumb + middle finger, or a combination of the index, middle, and thumb.

This definition of the fulcrum is only correct if the sticks/mallets pivot only about that exact point - usually they do not. To more accurately describe the mechanics of drumming one must define multiple fulcrums within a 'system of levers'.

Fulcrum and lever definitions

Fingers
If one consciously locks their wrist, elbow, and shoulder so that they remain stationary, the only degree of freedom left to move the stick is the finger lever. The fulcrum, or point of rotation, will be located approximately where the pad of the thumb meets the stick. The thumb acts as the fulcrum while the other 4 fingers can apply mechanical forces to the stick. This lever is controlled with the smallest muscles and involves the least amount of mass in motion. Because there is less mass and less inertia, the fingers and thumb will be used to move the stick at high frequencies.

Wrist
If one then locks the fingers in place by placing a tight grip on the stick the only way to raise and lower the stick is by rotating the wrist.  The point of rotation is now somewhere in the middle of the wrist. The wrist is used to move the stick in larger motions leading to higher volume notes. The wrist is almost always used in conjunction with the fingers. If one were to hold their sticks or mallets with a 'death grip' while using only wrist rotation, there is the possibility of Tendinitis or Carpal Tunnel Syndrome occurring.

Forearm
The forearm can be thought of as a shock absorber for the wrist and fingers. In general, the forearms will move slightly as a reaction to the forces the wrist and fingers are putting on the sticks. There is disagreement in the drum community regarding how much arm motion should be used. If one then freezes the wrist and finger levers they can move their stick, hand, and forearm by rotating at the elbow.

Each lever in the 'system' is suited to a particular purpose. In general they all work together to make up a 'correct' technique, allowing one to command their sticks/mallets to move exactly as they wish.

External link and reference
 Drumming mechanics at www.snarescience.com

Percussion performance techniques